Karol Linetty (born 2 February 1995) is a Polish professional footballer who plays as a midfielder for Serie A club Torino and the Poland national team.

International career
Linetty made his debut for the Poland national team on 18 January 2014 against Norway and scored goal in this game. He also was member for Euro 2016.

In June 2018 he was named in Poland's 23-man squad for the 2018 FIFA World Cup in Russia.

Career statistics

Club

International

Scores and results list Poland's goal tally first, score column indicates score after each Linetty goal.

Honours
Lech Poznań
 Ekstraklasa: 2014–15
 Polish Super Cup: 2015

References

External links

1995 births
Living people
People from Żnin County
Sportspeople from Kuyavian-Pomeranian Voivodeship
Association football midfielders
Polish footballers
Poland youth international footballers
Poland under-21 international footballers
Poland international footballers
Lech Poznań players
Ekstraklasa players
U.C. Sampdoria players
Torino F.C. players
Serie A players
UEFA Euro 2016 players
2018 FIFA World Cup players
UEFA Euro 2020 players
Polish expatriate footballers
Expatriate footballers in Italy
Polish expatriate sportspeople in Italy